FX4 may refer to:

 Austin FX4, a taxicab by Austin Motor Company
 a trim of the Ford F-150 series of pickup trucks
 FX4, an album by Jake "virt" Kaufman